Cephalota deserticola is a species of tiger beetle that can be found in Afghanistan, Armenia, Iran, Russia, Ukraine, Central Asia, and northern part of China.

References

Cicindelidae
Beetles described in 1836
Beetles of Asia